Sydney Ikebaku (born 24 May 1956) is a Nigerian weightlifter. He competed in the men's featherweight event at the 1980 Summer Olympics.

References

External links
 

1956 births
Living people
Nigerian male weightlifters
Olympic weightlifters of Nigeria
Weightlifters at the 1980 Summer Olympics
Place of birth missing (living people)
20th-century Nigerian people
21st-century Nigerian people